What Is Love? is the fifth extended play by South Korean girl group Twice. It was released on April 9, 2018, by JYP Entertainment and is distributed by Iriver. It includes the title track of the same name produced by Park Jin-young. Twice members Jeongyeon, Chaeyoung, and Jihyo also took part in writing lyrics for two songs on the EP.

Composed of six tracks overall, the EP received positive ratings from several music critics. It was also a commercial success for the group, reaching sales of over 340,000 copies. With this, Twice became the first Korean female act and the fifth music act overall to earn a Platinum certification from the Korea Music Content Association. 

An expanded reissue of the EP titled Summer Nights was released on July 9, 2018.

Background and release
On February 26, 2018, JYP Entertainment confirmed that Twice planned to release a new Korean album in April. On March 25, the agency announced that Twice would release their fifth EP titled What Is Love? on April 9. A promotion schedule for the mini-album was uploaded by the group on their official Twitter account. The first group image teaser was uploaded online the next day. On March 27, individual teaser photos featuring Nayeon, Jeongyeon, Momo, and Sana were released. On March 28, individual teaser photos featuring Jihyo, Mina, Dahyun, Chaeyoung, and Tzuyu were uploaded by the group. On the same day, JYP Entertainment confirmed that the album's lead single "What Is Love?" was written and produced by agency founder Park Jin-young, marking a year since Park last collaborated with Twice as a producer following the release of "Signal" in 2017. A part of the album's track list was later uploaded, revealing additional details crediting Lee Woo-min "collapsedone" for the arrangement of the lead single. On March 29, a second group image teaser was uploaded by the group. On the same day, a second teaser for the EP's track list was released, revealing two new tracks written by Twice members: "Sweet Talker" which was penned by Jeongyeon and Chaeyoung, and "Ho!" with lyrics written by Jihyo.

On March 30, a second set of individual teaser photos featuring Tzuyu, Chaeyoung, Dahyun, and Mina were uploaded. The full track list was also revealed by the group, announcing that the EP will feature six songs in total, with the sixth track "Stuck" being exclusive for the album's physical edition. On March 31, individual teaser photos featuring Jeongyeon, Momo, Sana, Jihyo, and Nayeon were uploaded. On April 1, the group uploaded an image containing the full lyrics for "What Is Love?". On the same day, member Nayeon uploaded a behind-the-scenes photo for the album in the group's official Instagram account, and also appeared at the 2018 KBO League to throw the ceremonial first pitch for the match between LG Twins and KIA Tigers. 

On April 2, Twice released the first music video teaser for "What Is Love?" on JYP Entertainment's Youtube channel. On April 3, a second music video teaser clip featuring Chaeyoung, Dahyun, and Nayeon was released, revealing a part of the song's "question mark" point choreography. The following day, a third music video teaser clip featuring Momo, Sana, and Jeongyeon was uploaded. On April 5, a fourth music video teaser clip featuring Jihyo, Tzuyu, and Mina was released. On April 6, a fifth music video teaser clip featuring all Twice members was released, revealing a snippet of the title track. On April 7, the group uploaded an album highlight medley featuring snippets for all tracks. On April 8, Twice revealed the cover image for the album's digital release.

The EP was released as a digital download on various music sites on April 9 while the physical album was released the following day. "Stuck", which was initially a "CD-only" track on the physical album, was released digitally on April 30.

On July 9, the group released an expanded reissue for the EP titled Summer Nights, which was supported by the lead single "Dance The Night Away".

Composition 
What Is Love? is an EP consisting of six tracks overall. The title track "What Is Love?" is written and produced by Park Jin-young, is classified as a "hyper-pop" dance song that crosses over the trap genre, which lyrically talks about one's imaginations and curiosities regarding love, while ever only learning about it through books, movies, or television dramas. "Sweet Talker", written by members Jeongyeon and Chaeyoung, heavily features synth music mixed with percussions. "Ho!" is penned by Jihyo, and is described as a summer pop song that emphasizes a brass-driven band arrangement. "Deja Vu" is classified as a pop song that makes use of a "la la la"-worded hook and features a dubstep break. "Say Yes" is an acoustic-driven pop track with heavy influence from R&B while featuring the group's distinctive ballad sound. 

The album's closing track, "Stuck", lyrically describes the feeling of falling in love. The track's lyricist took inspiration from the relationship between Twice and their fans.

Promotion 
On the day of the album's release, Twice members Jeongyeon, Sana, and Tzuyu made an appearance on the KBS2 public talk show Hello Counselor, wherein they performed a part of the title track "What Is Love?" for the first time in live broadcast. Later that day, all members of the group then held a live showcase at the Yes24 Live Hall in Gwangjang-dong, Seoul wherein they performed the full song for the first time. 

The group promoted their album in several South Korean music programs, starting with their appearance on M Countdown on April 12, 2018. They also made performances on KBS2's Music Bank on April 13, MBC's Show! Music Core on April 14, SBS' Inkigayo on April 15, and on MBC M's Show Champion on April 18 wherein the title track received its first music show win, among other performance dates. Music show promotions for What Is Love? ended on April 29. The title track achieved a total of 12 music show wins, with its last win being on Inkigayo in its episode aired on May 6.

Twice also made an appearance on You Hee-yeol's Sketchbook in its broadcast on April 15 wherein they performed "What Is Love?". They also performed the album's title track on a special broadcast of M Countdown for KCON Japan 2018 on April 19.

Critical reception 
Josh Shim of The Kraze magazine left a positive review for the EP, giving it a rating of 9.5 out of 10 points, stating that "What Is Love? may be Twice’s best mini-album since their glorious debut EP The Story Begins, and it’s because it shows the most growth among all the group’s releases so far." He further praised the production work for all the tracks, and described the album to be among the group's most cohesive releases overall. Music review site Popfection gave the EP a rating of 8.6 out of 10 points, describing it to be a "very solid release and comeback" from the group, while citing the title track alongside "Sweet Talker" and "Ho!" to be the album's highlights. Editor Nicole Moraleda of The South China Morning Post Youngpost described the album's track list as having "strong memorable hooks and cool soul-pop vibes", while further describing the EP to have dug further than conventional love songs.

Music review site Vibes of Silence gave a more lukewarm review for the EP, giving it a rating of 6.5 out of 10 points, praising the album's cohesiveness but pointing out the need for more versatility from the group.

Commercial performance
On April 4, 2018, it was reported that pre-order sales for What Is Love? reached over 350,000 copies, surpassing the pre-order sales numbers achieved by Twice's full-length album Twicetagram which exceeded 330,000 pre-order copies. Upon release, the album debuted at number 2 on Gaon Album Chart while the title track topped the Gaon Digital Chart. The album also entered both the Oricon Albums and Japan Digital Albums charts at numbers 2 and 3 respectively. The EP and its title track both entered the Billboard World Albums and World Digital Song Sales charts at number 3 respectively. What Is Love? was also Twice's first album to enter on the Billboard Independent Albums chart ranked at number 35.

What Is Love? became the third best-selling album in South Korea for the month of April, selling 335,235 copies. With this, Twice became the first female artist—and the fifth overall act—to earn a Platinum certification from the Korea Music Content Association for reaching sales of over 250,000 copies since certifications began in 2018. By year-end, the EP became the tenth best-selling album in South Korea in 2018, reaching 348,797 copies sold.

Track listing

Personnel
Credits adapted from album liner notes.

 J. Y. Park "The Asiansoul" – producer
 Lee Ji-young – direction and coordination (A&R)
 Jang Ha-na – music (A&R)
 Kim Yeo-joo (Jane Kim) – music (A&R)
 Kim Ji-hyeong – production (A&R)
 Cha Ji-yoon – production (A&R)
 Choi A-ra – production (A&R)
 Kim Je-na (Jenna Kim) – production (A&R)
 Kim Bo-hyeon – design (A&R), album art direction and design
 Kim Tae-eun – design (A&R), album art direction and design, and web design
 Choi Jeong-eun – design (A&R) and album art direction and design
 Lee So-yeon – design (A&R), album art direction and design, and web design
 Eom Se-hee – recording and mixing engineer
 Choi Hye-jin – recording and mixing engineer
 No Min-ji – recording engineer
 Lee Ju-hyeong – recording engineer, and vocal director, keyboard, Pro Tools operator, and digital editor (on "Say Yes")
 Friday of Galactika – recording engineer, and vocal producer and background vocals (on "What Is Love?" and "Stuck")
 Tony Maserati – mixing engineer
 James Krausse – mixing engineer
 Lim Hong-jin – mixing engineer
 Ko Hyeon-jeong – mixing engineer
 Master Key – mixing engineer
 Kwon Nam-woo – mastering engineer
 Naive Production – video director
 Kim Young-jo – video executive producer
 Yoo Seung-woo – video executive producer
 Choi Pyeong-gang – video co-producer
 Jang Deok-hwa at Agency PROD – photographer
 Seo Yeon-ah – web design
 Son Eun-hee at Lulu – hair and makeup director
 Jung Nan-young at Lulu – hair and makeup director
 Choi Ji-young at Lulu – hair and makeup director
 Jo Sang-ki at Lulu – hair and makeup director
 Zia at Lulu – hair and makeup director
 Jeon Dal-lae at Lulu – hair and makeup director
 Won Jung-yo at Bit&Boot – makeup director
 Choi Su-ji at Bit&Boot – makeup director
 Choi Hee-seon at F. Choi – style director
 Seo Ji-eun at F. Choi – style director
 Lee Ga-young at F. Choi – style director
 Lee Jin-young at F. Choi – style director
 Park Soo-young at F. Choi – style director
 Park Jin-hee at F. Choi – style director
 Han Jin-joo at F. Choi – style director
 Shin Hyun-kuk – management and marketing director
 Yoon Hee-so – choreographer
 Kang Da-sol – choreographer
 Kyle Hanagami – choreographer
 Freemind Choi Young-joon – choreographer
 Freemind Chae Da-som – choreographer
 Choi Nam-mi – choreographer
 Today Art – printing
 Lee Woo-min "collapsedone" – all instruments, computer programming, guitar, synths, and piano (on "What Is Love?")
 E.Na – background vocals (on "What Is Love?" and "Stuck")
 Park Soo-min – background vocals (on "What Is Love?", "Sweet Talker" and "Ho!")
 Erik Lidbom – all instruments, computer programming, and digital editor (on "Sweet Talker")
 Armadillo – vocal director (on "Sweet Talker")
 Jiyoung Shin NYC – additional editor (on "Sweet Talker", "Ho!", and "Dejavu")
 The Elev3n – all instruments, computer programming, and digital editor (on "Ho!")
 Kim Seung-soo – vocal director (on "Ho!")
 Mental Audio (Eirik Johansen and Jan Hallvard Larsen) – all instruments and computer programming (on "Dejavu")
 Hayley Aitken – background vocals (on "Dejavu")
 Anne Judith Wik – background vocals (on "Dejavu")
 Jowul – vocal director (on "Dejavu")
 Jeon Jae-hee – background vocals (on "Say Yes")
 Jeok Jae – guitar (on "Say Yes")
 Kim Byeong-seok – bass (on "Say Yes")
 Frants – all instruments, computer programming, synth, bass, and drum (on "Stuck")
 Shane – guitar (on "Stuck")

Locations
Recording
JYPE Studios, Seoul, South Korea

Mixing
Mirrorball Studios, North Hollywood, California
JYPE Studios, Seoul, South Korea
Koko Sound, Seoul, South Korea
Studio Instinct, Seoul, South Korea
821 Sound, Seoul, South Korea

Mastering
821 Sound Mastering, Seoul, South Korea

Photography
Imvely flagship store "Velyne", Seoul, South Korea

Charts

Weekly charts

Year-end charts

Certifications

Accolades

Release history

References

2018 EPs
Twice (group) EPs
JYP Entertainment EPs
Korean-language EPs
IRiver EPs